Vladimir Vladimirovich Nagibin (born 12 October 1981) is a Russian former professional footballer.

Club career
He made his professional debut in the Russian Second Division in 1999 for FC Zenit-2 St. Petersburg. He played 4 games and scored 1 goal in the UEFA Intertoto Cup 2000 for FC Zenit St. Petersburg.

Honours
 Russian Cup finalist: 2002 (played in the early stages of the 2001/02 tournament for FC Zenit St. Petersburg).

References

1981 births
Footballers from Saint Petersburg
Living people
Russian footballers
Association football midfielders
FC Zenit Saint Petersburg players
FC KAMAZ Naberezhnye Chelny players
FC Sibir Novosibirsk players
FC Metallurg Lipetsk players
FC Sever Murmansk players
Russian Premier League players
FC Zenit-2 Saint Petersburg players